The Hogarth Living Poets were two series of books published by Hogarth Press, under the editorship of Dorothy Wellesley. The editions were limited, and the books are now rare.

First Series (1928-1932)
24 books.

1. Frances Cornford Different Days
2. G. Fitzurse It Was Not Jones 
3. Dorothy Wellesley Matrix
5. Ida Affleck Graves The China Cupboard and other poems
9. C. Day-Lewis Transitional Poem
10. William Plomer The Family Tree
11. Vita Sackville-West King's Daughter
14. Edwin Arlington Robinson Cavender's House
17. Dorothy Wellesley editor: A broadcast anthology of modern poetry
21. John Lehmann A Garden Revisited and other poems
22. C. Day-Lewis From Feathers to Iron
24. Michael Roberts editor New Signatures

Second Series (1933-1937)
Five books.

1 C. Day-Lewis The Magnetic Mountain
2. John Lehmann The Noise of History
3. R. C. Trevelyan Beelzebub and other poems

British poetry
Hogarth Press books
Series of books